The common name umbrella plant can refer to several unrelated species:

 Cyperus alternifolius (umbrella papyrus)
 Darmera peltata (Indian rhubarb)
 Diphylleia cymosa (umbrellaleaf)
 Eriogonum longifolium var. harperi (Harper's umbrella plant or Harper's buckwheat)
 Podophyllum peltatum (American Mayapple)
 Schefflera arboricola (umbrella tree)

See also
Umbrella palm
Umbrella tree